Trachyopella is a subgenus of flies belonging to the family of the Lesser Dung flies.

Species
T. aposterna Marshall in Marshall & Montagnes, 1990
T. apotarsata Marshall in Marshall & Montagnes, 1990
T. artivena Roháček & Marshall, 1986
T. atomus (Rondani, 1880)
T. binuda Roháček & Marshall, 1986
T. bovilla Collin, 1954
T. brachystoma (Papp, 1972)
T. brevisectoris Marshall in Marshall & Montagnes, 1990
T. coprina (Duda, 1918)
T. folkei Roháček, 1990
T. formosae (Duda, 1925)
T. hardyi (Tenorio, 1967)
T. hyalinervis (Duda, 1925)
T. kuntzei (Duda, 1918)
T. lineafrons (Spuler, 1925)
T. luteocera Marshall in Marshall & Montagnes, 1990
T. melania (Haliday, 1836)
T. microps (Papp, 1972)
T. minuscula Collin, 1956
T. mitis Roháček & Marshall, 1986
T. novaeguineae (Papp, 1972)
T. nuda Roháček & Marshall, 1986
T. pannosa Roháček & Marshall, 1986
T. pectamera Roháček & Marshall, 1986
T. pedimera Marshall in Marshall & Montagnes, 1990
T. perparva (Williston, 1896)
T. senaria Roháček & Marshall, 1986
T. straminea Roháček & Marshall, 1986
T. vockerothi Marshall in Marshall & Montagnes, 1990

References

Sphaeroceridae
Muscomorph flies of Europe
Diptera of Africa
Diptera of Asia
Diptera of North America
Diptera of Australasia
Insect subgenera